

Europe

Events
 Emergence of the troubadour, trouvère and minnesänger traditions, in the Occitan, Langues d'oïl and Middle High German vernaculars respectively

Major works
 1180 to 1210 - Nibelungenlied
 Aiol and Mirabel in Old French
 The Tale of Igor's Campaign in Old East Slavic, dated near the end of the century
 Durham in Old English
 Ormulum in Middle English
 Chanson d'Antioche and other crusader tales at the beginning of the century.

Poets
 Chakhrukhadze poet, author of Tamariani
 Shota Rustaveli poet of the 12th century,  author of "The Knight in the Panther's Skin"
 Chrétien de Troyes flourishes in the 1170s and 1180s
 Marie de France flourishes from approximately 1170 through 1205/1210, author of lais in Anglo-Norman
 Jean Bodel
 Undated troubadors
 Bernart de Ventadorn (c. 1130s - c. 1190s)
 Cercamon (fl. 1130s and 1140s)
 Marcabru (fl. 1140s and 1150s)
 Arnaut de Mareuil (fl. late 12th century)
 Goliard poets, writing in Latin, flourish in European universities
 Nigel de Longchamps, writing in Latin in England
 John of Hauville, writing in Latin, probably in France
 Walter of Châtillon, writing in Latin in France
 Cynddelw Brydydd Mawr, fl. in the last half of the century in Wales
 Joseph ben Isaac Bekhor Shor, writing in Hebrew in France in the last half of the century
 Hartmann von Aue (c. 1160 - 1210s), writing in Middle High German

Middle East

Events
 Emergence of Turkic poetry

Byzantine poets
 Michael Glykas
 Theodore Prodromos (c. 1100 - c. 1165/70)
 Nicholas Kallikles
 John Tzetzes (c. 1100  - 1180)
 Constantine Manasses (c. 1130 - c. 1187)
 Manganeios Prodromos
 Constantine Stilbes
 Niketas Eugenianos

Arab world poets
Ibn al-Farid (1181–1235)
Muhyi al-din ibn al-'Arabi, (died 1240)
Ahmad al-Tifashi (died 1253)

Persia

Persian poets
 Adib Sabir ادیب صابر
 Am'aq عمعق بخارائی
 Anvari انوری ابیوردی
 Nasrullah Monshi
 Farid al-Din Attar, poet (about 1130-about 1220) فریدالدین عطار نیشاپوری
 Omar Khayyám, poet (1048-1131) عمر خیام
 Nizami Ganjavi, poet (about 1141-1209) نظامی
 Nizami Aruzi
 Saadi, poet (1184-1283/1291?) سعدی
 Sheikh Ruzbehanشیخ روزبهان
 Abdul Qadir Jilaniعبدالقادر گیلانی
 Khaqani Shirvani خاقانی شروانی
 Sanaayiسنایی
 Zhende pil
 Muhammad Aufi
 Masudi Ghaznavi
 Jmaluddin Aburuh
 Falaki Shirvani
 Hassan Ghaznavi, poet
 Ardeshir Ebadi
 Sanai Ghaznavi, poet
 Abulfadhl Meybodi
 Mu'izzi
 Ein-ul Quzzat Hamedani
 Mihani
 Shahmardan
 Ibn Balkhi
 Muzaffer Esfazari
 The author of Mejmal al-tawarikh wal-qesas
 Mohammed Ghanemi
 Qattan Marvzi
 Uthman Mukhtari
 Ismail Jorjani
 Mahsati مهستی گنجوی, a woman poet from Azerbaijan
 Omar ibn Sahlan
 Rashid al-Din Muhammad al-Umari Vatvat خولجه رشید الدین وطواط
 Abulfotuh Razi
 Nizami Arudhi Samarqandiنظامی عروضی سمرقندی

China

Chinese poets
Lu You 陸游 (1125–1209), Southern Song dynasty poet in the shi and ci forms, born on a boat on the Wei River early on a rainy morning, October 17; known for the poem 示儿 ("To my son")

Japan

Japanese works
Imperial poetry anthologies:
 Kin'yō Wakashū 10 scrolls, 716 poems, ordered by former Emperor Shirakawa, drafts completed 1124–1127, compiled by Minamoto no Shunrai (Toshiyori)
 Shika Wakashū 10 scrolls, 411 poems, ordered in 1144 by former Emperor Sutoku, completed c. 1151–1154, compiled by Fujiwara Akisuke
 Senzai Wakashū 20 scrolls, 1,285 poems, ordered by former Emperor Shirakawa, probably completed in 1188, compiled by Fujiwara no Shunzei (also known as Toshinari)

Japanese poets
Fujiwara no Akisue 藤原顕季 (1055–1123), late Heian period poet and nobleman, member of the Fujiwara poetic and aristocratic clan
Fujiwara no Ietaka 藤原家隆 (1158–1237), early Kamakura period waka poet; has several poems in the Shin Kokin Wakashū anthology; related by marriage to Jakuren; pupil of Fujiwara no Shunzei's
Fujiwara no Shunzei 藤原俊成, also known as "Fujiwara no Toshinari", "Shakua" 釈阿, "Akihiro" 顕広 (1114–1204), poet and nobleman, noted for his innovations in the waka poetic form and for compiling Senzai Wakashū ("Collection of a Thousand Years"), the seventh Imperial anthology of waka poetry,; father of Fujiwara no Teika; son of Fujiwara no Toshitada
Fujiwara no Teika 藤原定家, also known as "Fujiwara no Sadaie" or "Sada-ie" (1162–1242), a widely venerated late Heian period and early Kamakura period waka poet and (for centuries) extremely influential critic; also a scribe, scholar and widely influential anthologist; the Tale of Matsura is generally attributed to him; son of Fujiwara no Shunzei; associated with Jakuren
Fujiwara no Tameie 藤原為家 (1198–1275), the central figure in a circle of poets after the Jōkyū War in 1221; second son of poets Teika and Abutuni
Emperor Go-Toba, 後鳥羽天皇, also known as  山科僧正 (1180–1239)
Gyōi 行意 (1177–1217?), late Heian, early Kamakura period poet and Buddhist monk; one of the New Thirty-six Poetry Immortals; son of Fujiwara no Motofusa
 Jakuren 寂蓮, also known as "Fujiwara no Sadanaga" 藤原定長 before becoming a monk (1139–1202), initially adopted by Fujiwara no Shunzei, later stepped aside as Shunzei's heir and became a Buddhist priest; on the model of Saigyo, traveled around the country, composing poems; frequently associated with Fujiwara no Teika; one of six compilers of the eighth imperial waka anthology, Shin Kokin Wakashū, which contains 36 of his poems; adopted Fujiwara no Ietaka, a pupil of Shunzei's; has a poem in the Hyakunin Isshu anthology
Jien 慈円 (1155–1225) poet, historian, and Buddhist monk
Jinzai Kiyoshi 神西清 (1903–1957) Shōwa period novelist, translator, literary critic, poet and playwright
Kamo no Chōmei 鴨長明 (1155–1216), author, waka poet and essayist
Minamoto no Shunrai, also "Minamoto Toshiyori", (c. 1057–1129) poet who compiled the Gosen Wakashū anthology; passed over to compile the Goshūi Wakashū, Shunrai's angry polemical, "Errors in the Goshūishū", apparently led Emperor Shirakawa to appoint him to compile the Kin'yō Wakashū imperial anthology, which was itself controversial
Minamoto no Yorimasa 源頼政 (1106–1180) poet, government official and warrior; his poems appeared in various anthologies
 Saigyō Hōshi 西行法師 pen name of Satō Norikiyo 佐藤義清, who took the religious name En'i 円位 (1118–1190), late Heian and early Kamakura period waka poet who worked as a guard to retired Emperor Toba, then became a Buddhist monk at age 22
 Princess Shikishi 式子内親王 (died 1201), late Heian and early Kamakura period poet, never-married daughter of Emperor Go-Shirakawa; entered service at the Kamo Shrine in Kyoto in 1159, later left the shrine, in later years a Buddhist nun; has 49 poems in the Shin Kokin Shū anthology
 Shunzei's Daughter, popular name of Fujiwara Toshinari no Musume 藤原俊成女、, also 藤原俊成卿女、皇(太)后宮大夫俊成(卿)女, 越部禅尼 (c. 1171 – c. 1252), called the greatest female poet of her day, ranked with Princess Shikishi; her grandfather was the poet Fujiwara no Shunzei

South Asia

Poets
 Jayadeva, Gita Govinda, in Sanskrit
 Akka Mahadevi, in Kannada
 Allama Prabhu, in Kannada
 Nagavarma II, in Kannada
 Rudrabhatta, in Kannada
 Chand Bardai, in Hindi
 Fariduddin Ganjshakar, in Punjabi

Southeast Asia
 Kakawin Hariwangsa (mid-century), in Java

Decades and years

 01
Poetry by century